Streptomyces indonesiensis is a bacterium species from the genus of Streptomyces which has been isolated from the tree Paraserianthes falcataria from Yogyakarta on Java in Indonesia.

See also 
 List of Streptomyces species

References

Further reading

External links
Type strain of Streptomyces indonesiensis at BacDive -  the Bacterial Diversity Metadatabase	

indonesiensis
Bacteria described in 2001